Agabus aeruginosus is a species of predatory diving beetle belonging to the family Dytiscidae. It is found in the United States. Its habitats include small vernal ponds.

References

Agabus (beetle)
Beetles of the United States
Beetles described in 1838
Taxa named by Charles Nicholas Aubé